The Caledonian Railway 498 Class was a class of s built for dock shunting.  They were designed by John F. McIntosh for the Caledonian Railway (CR) and introduced in 1911. Twenty-three were built. They passed to the London, Midland and Scottish Railway (LMS) in 1923 and to British Railways (BR) in 1948. Their numbers are shown in the table below.

The 498 Class was the prototype for the popular 3 1/2" gauge live steam locomotive design 'Rob Roy' by Martin Evans.

Numbering table

The engines were withdrawn between 1958 and 1962.

See also
 Locomotives of the Caledonian Railway
 Locomotives of the London, Midland and Scottish Railway

References

External links 
 Railuk database

498
0-6-0T locomotives
Railway locomotives introduced in 1911

Shunting locomotives